James Hodgson may refer to:

James Day Hodgson (1915–2012), American politician
James Hodgson (cricketer, born 1972), English cricketer
James Hodgson (cricketer, born 1969), headmaster of Bedford School and English cricketer
James Hodgson (mathematician) (1672–1755), English mathematical teacher, lecturer and writer
James Hodgson (merchant) (c. 1790–1870), British merchant